The men's team clay pigeons was a shooting sports event held as part of the Shooting at the 1924 Summer Olympics programme. It was the fourth appearance of the event. The competition was held on 6 and 7 July 1924 at the shooting ranges at Issy-les-Moulineaux. 69 shooters from 12 nations competed.

Note: The International Olympic Committee medal database shows all six team members as medalists. The shooters in italics were the weakest of their teams and their scores did not count for the team score.

Results

A maximum of six competitors per nation were allowed. The scores of the best four shooters on each team were summed to give a team score.

References

External links
 Official Report
 

Shooting at the 1924 Summer Olympics